Velicham TV is a Tamil TV Channel based in Chennai, Tamil Nadu, India. It was launched on 14 April 2016. The Inaugural function was live facilitated Captain TV by DMDK Leader Vijayakanth, MDMK Leader Vaiko, Communist leaders Mutharasan, Ramakrishnan

Launch
The Channel was launched on 14 April 2016 by Desiya Murpokku Dravida Kazhagam founder Vijayakanth.

Management
Velicham TV is managed by Velicham TV Network Its managing director is Thol. Thirumavalavan  The channel is owned by Viduthalai Chiruthaigal Katchi (VCK).

References

External links
Velicham TV 
Velicham TV in News 
TV Networks of Tamil Nadu political parties 

Tamil-language television channels
Television stations in Chennai